Lady of the Mirrors is a solo album by pianist and composer Anthony Davis recorded in 1980 for the India Navigation label.

Reception

Allmusic awarded the album 4 stars, stating: "in general the complex and often-fascinating music is quite original and has no obvious predecessor. Lady of the Mirrors is still one of Anthony Davis' finest piano recordings".

Track listing
All compositions by Anthony Davis
 "Beyond Reason" - 6:25
 "Lady of the Mirrors" - 5:05
 "Five Moods from an English Garden" - 9:40
 "Under the Double Moon" - 12:15
 "Man on a Turquoise Cloud" - 6:15
 "Whose Life?" - 6:58 Bonus track on CD reissue

Personnel 
 Anthony Davis - piano

References 

1980 albums
Anthony Davis (composer) albums
India Navigation albums